Mark E. Emblidge (born 1953) has worked on policy issues on behalf of literacy in the U.S. for at-risk populations from childhood through adulthood.

Early life and schooling

Emblidge was born in upstate New York in 1953. His family is of Dutch Irish descent. He graduated from Oakton High School in Vienna, Virginia, and received a BA in political science at Gordon College, Massachusetts, and a master's degree and doctorate in education at the University of Virginia.

Career in education

Emblidge currently serves as an affiliate professor at the School of Education at Virginia Commonwealth University (VCU).  In 2004 he became the Director of the Literacy Institute at VCU.  Established to provide research and development projects that study the problems of illiteracy, the Literacy Institute has attracted three Early Reading First grants from the U.S. Department of Education from 2004 through 2011 totaling over $12 million.  These grants, which focused on children and adults in poverty, resulted in an innovative project called "Excell" (Excellence in Children's Early Language and Literacy), which promotes early language and literacy acquisition for pre-K students in various communities and schools throughout Richmond, Virginia. Emblidge served as the three grants' principal investigator.

Overseeing a Bill and Melinda Gates Foundation Grant in 1999, he became the founding director of Communities in Schools (CIS) of Virginia, which he started with U.S. Senator Mark Warner and former U.S. Senator George Allen.  CIS develops alternative remedies for at-risk juvenile students who are in danger of dropping out of high school.

Pursuing his lifelong interest in promoting literacy across the lifespan, Emblidge became the founding Executive Director of the Virginia Literacy Foundation (VLF) in Richmond, Virginia, which he established with Virginia's former first lady, Jeannie Baliles in 1987, a position he continues to hold to this day. The VLF provides grants and technical advice and training to Virginia's community-based and faith-based literacy organizations.

Work on political campaigns and transition teams

In addition to his interest in promoting literacy for children and adults, Emblidge has been active in national and local politics.

Since the 1980s Dr Emblidge has worked for the Democratic Party on both the state and national levels. He worked as the Democratic party national finance director in 1982-83,  and as the financial director for Chuck Robb's Virginia Governor Campaign in 1981  and John Glenn's run for the presidency in 1983–1984. He also served as the transition director for Virginia's Attorney General-elect Mary Sue Terry (1985) and on the education transition team for Virginia Governor-elect Timothy M. Kaine (November 2005-January 2006). From December 2008 through January 2009, Emblidge worked as a member of President Barack Obama's transition team.

Political and educational appointments

Virginia
Emblidge's work in education and literacy includes service on the City of Richmond School Board. Starting in 1994, he served for four terms, including three as chairman. In 2002 Dr Emblidge was appointed President to the Board of Education in Virginia by Governor Mark R. Warner, and held that position until January 2010.  "The fact that we have 92 percent of our schools fully accredited is wonderful, but there are still students who are not passing the tests. We also want to take a look at those students who have no difficulty passing the SOL tests and figure out how we can continually challenge them, so that when they graduate they can compete with anyone in the world.", Emblidge said about his work.

In 2009 outgoing Governor Timothy M. Kaine appointed Emblidge to the board of trustees of the Library of Virginia, and he became its chair in 2013.

National
In 1995, President Bill Clinton appointed Emblidge to the advisory board of the National Institute for Literacy (NIFL),  now known for its LINCS (Literacy Information and Communication System) resources, on which he served as chair from 1998 to 2002. NIFL was a federally funded organization that provided information to literacy programs about literacy rates and learning techniques for adults and children.

International
Emblidge was a 2010 Franklin Fellow with the U.S. Department of State, where he will serve in the Office of the United States Special Envoy to Sudan as a special education advisor  and work with General Scott Gration in designing education programs for Sudan. While there, he urged the Sudanese government to seek contributions to education from the private sector and other countries, and to invite Sudanese dispersed throughout the world to return to their country to use their talents to develop education. 
From 1987 to 1990, during Margaret Thatcher's tenure, he worked as a consultant with the Communities in Schools of Great Britain.

Personal life
Emblidge is married to Roberta (Robbie) née Banning. They have two daughters, Catherine and Caroline. He lives in Richmond, Virginia.

References

External links

 Board of Education Elects Mark E. Emblidge
 VCU Literacy Institute wins $4.5 million grant
 U.S. Remains Committed to South Sudan Education

1953 births
Living people
People from Richmond, Virginia
Virginia Democrats
Curry School of Education alumni
Virginia Commonwealth University people
Adult education leaders
Oakton High School alumni